Lemmings 2: The Tribes is a puzzle video game released in 1993, the sequel to Lemmings. As with the original, it was developed by DMA Design and published by Psygnosis. The gameplay remains mostly the same as the original game, requiring the player to lead a certain number of lemmings to their exit by giving them the appropriate "skills".

Storyline
There is an introduction movie explaining the storyline of the game. Once upon a time, the twelve lemming tribes of Lemming Island lived joyfully and peacefully. However, an ancient prophecy foretells a great darkness soon to cover the island. This prophecy tells that the only way the lemmings can live is by getting off their island, using the power of the Lemming Talisman. This talisman consists of twelve pieces, one owned by each tribe. With the help of the Guide that has helped them before (referring to the player in the previous Lemmings game), all lemmings must now reach the center point of their island in order to escape their doom.

Gameplay

There are many more skills available in Lemmings 2: 51 in total (although no more than eight are available in each level), as compared to eight in the original game. Some of the skills are similar to the original ones (like digging and building variants), while others are all new (several flying skills, for example). One skill, the "attractor", will cause the lemming to play a musical instrument and have nearby lemmings stop walking to do a dance. The instrument and dances performed vary by tribe.

A practice mode was also added. In this mode, any type of skill available can be selected for the player to experiment with. There is a choice of four different practice levels. There is still a total of 120 levels, but in this game they are divided into ten levels for each of twelve tribes. Each tribe's levels can be started at any time, and progress can be saved from the main menu. The player starts out with 60 lemmings for each tribe, but only one lemming needs to make it to an exit in order to progress to next level. The number saved will then be the number left in the next level. As some levels may require several lemmings to complete, the player might have to replay an earlier level to save more lemmings for the following ones if they realize they do not have enough.

The player will be rewarded with a bronze, silver or gold medal, depending on how many lemmings are saved in the level. This will also dictate the type of the talisman part received once all the tribe's levels are completed. To watch the outro and credits, all golden talisman parts need to be won by rescuing enough lemmings from each tribe. A new fast forward button and fan button have been added to the controls. The fast forward replaces the release rate button in the original game, which would let the player release more lemmings at a time. The fan button turns the cursor into a fan, which is used to push around any flying lemmings or to affect wind-powered elements.

Development
Mike Dailly, programmer at DMA Design, compared Lemmings 2 to its predecessor in 2015: "Lemmings 2 was a different beast, the tech was much more complex, but designed to make console versions much better. I think it had too many skills, but the underlying tech was great. I was given the SNES version to do, and it was one of the most complex games I’ve had to write. Some complex internals that had to run quick on a 3.5Mhz chip. Tricky stuff – but fun!"

Ports
Known ports of the Amiga game include: DOS, Mega Drive, Super NES, Game Boy, Acorn Archimedes, Atari ST and FM Towns. The Amiga CD32 version was cancelled. Ports to the Master System and Game Gear were completed along with the Game Boy version but the former were never released commercially.

The next game in the Lemmings series after Lemmings 2 is All New World of Lemmings (1994), which continues the storyline with the Egyptian, Shadow and Classic tribes.

Reception

Lemmings 2 was not quite as popular as Lemmings was, nor was it ported to as many platforms. In the United Kingdom, it was the top-selling Amiga game in February 1993, and the top-selling PC game in March 1993.

The game was well received by critics, who widely considered it to be better than the original game. Bruce and Margaret Howden of Compute! commented "This sequel is packed with cute, engaging new features, more Lemming abilities, and oodles of new scenarios. If the original Lemmings was a perfect arcade game, then this is perfection improved upon." Computer Gaming World stated that Psygnosis had done "a first rate job with this sequel ... Lemmings 2 really is twice the game its predecessor was", with "lovingly designed" puzzles and "delightful animations", and concluded that it would be one of the "better purchases of the year".

Reviewing the Genesis version, GamePro commented that the controls themselves are easy to use but the small size of the lemmings makes it difficult to control them with any precision. However, they praised the variety and creativity of the level design and the different lemming maneuvers, as well as the game's "charming" personality and wide range of difficulty, and gave it an overall recommendation. They made similar comments of the Super NES version, and remarked that the game "adds nonlinear variety to the cartoony brainteasers mix." The five reviewers of Electronic Gaming Monthly were also pleased, with Mike Weigand commenting, "This title adds some nice twists (and graphics) to the standard guide-the-Lemmings-to-safety theme, making it a must for veterans of the games."

Next Generation reviewed the Genesis version of the game, and stated that "Lemmings fanatics are sure to love the new features and for those who've never experienced a Lemmings game, we strongly suggest checking this game out."

In a 2001 retrospective review, Rosemary Young wrote in Quandary that "Lemmings 2: Tribes will be hard to find now because of its age but, really, it's hardly aged at all. Although a little 'flat' the graphics are still perfectly good and the puzzles are just as fiendish. It compares very well with later Lemmings titles such as 3D Lemmings and Lemmings Revolution even if it doesn't offer the opportunity to save mid level."

Lemmings 2 was named Best Action/Arcade Game at the 1994 Codie awards. In 1995, Total! ranked the game 33rd on their Top 100 SNES Games writing: "This took the original format and piled on loads of new levels, a range of new lemmings and basically just gave us more of what we liked, only better.

References

External links
 
 Lemmings 2: The Tribes at Hall of Light
 

1993 video games
Acorn Archimedes games
Amiga games
Atari ST games
Cancelled Game Gear games
Cancelled classic Mac OS games
Cancelled Master System games
DOS games
Game Boy games
Lemmings games
FM Towns games
Puzzle video games
Sega Genesis games
Sega CD games
Super Nintendo Entertainment System games
Video game sequels
Video games developed in the United Kingdom
Video games scored by David Whittaker